The Last Movie is a 1971 metafictional drama film directed and edited by Dennis Hopper, who also stars in the leading role as a horse wrangler named after the state of Kansas. It is written by Stewart Stern, based on a story by Hopper and Stern, and stars an extensive supporting cast that includes Stella Garcia, Don Gordon, Peter Fonda, Julie Adams, Sylvia Miles, Samuel Fuller, Dean Stockwell, Russ Tamblyn, Tomas Milian, Toni Basil, Severn Darden, Henry Jaglom, Rod Cameron, and Kris Kristofferson & Michelle Phillips in their film debuts. The plot follows a disenfranchised stuntman (Hopper), who begins a filmmaking-centric cargo cult among Peruvian natives after going into self-imposed exile.

Greenlit after the success of Hopper's previous film Easy Rider, Universal Pictures gave the director/star complete creative control over the project, which was budgeted at $1 million and was shot in Peru. Hopper only loosely followed the script by Stern, filming hours upon hours of footage built around friends whom he invited to the set, including several of his collaborators Fonda and Basil. The film's elongated post-production came from Hopper's constant editing and re-editing of the film while suffering from the effects of his drug habit, leading to allegations of self-sabotage and missing the film's initial deadline to deliver a final cut nearly six months later.

Despite high expectations, including a well-received screening at the 1971 Venice International Film Festival, the film was a critical and financial disaster. Dissatisfied with the finished product, Universal Pictures gave the film a staggered, limited release under multiple alternative titles. Its poor reception led to Hopper's self-imposed exile from Hollywood for several years, not directing another film until Out of the Blue (1980). In the decades since its release, it has undergone a critical reappraisal and has become a cult classic.

Plot

Kansas (Hopper) is a stunt coordinator in charge of horses on a western being shot in a small Peruvian village. Following a tragic incident on the set where an actor is killed in a stunt, he decides to quit the movie business and stay in Peru with a local woman. He thinks he has found paradise, but is soon called in to help in a bizarre incident: the Peruvian natives are "filming" their own movie with "cameras" made of sticks, and acting out real western movie violence, as they don't understand movie fakery.

Cast

Analysis
The film touches on the ideas of fiction versus reality, especially in regards to cinema. The movie is presented in a way that challenges the viewer's traditional cinematic understanding of storytelling, by presenting the story in a non-chronological fashion, and by including several devices typically only seen behind the scenes of film-making (rough edits and "scene missing" cards), and the use of jarring jump cuts.

Production

Conception
Hopper later said he got the idea for the film when making The Sons of Katie Elder in Mexico. He says he came up with the story and got Stewart Stern to write the script; Stern had written Rebel Without a Cause, in which Hopper played a small role. He stated, "I had time to fantasise as to what would happen when we left this village, leaving behind all the movie set fronts built on their existing adobe houses and church. ... I wanted to use film as film; I wanted to keep saying, you're really just watching a movie."

Hopper tried for several years to secure financing for the film, intending it to be his directorial debut.

In July 1966 the New York Times reported that record producer Phil Spector would help make the movie with Hopper. "It will be an art movie," said Spector. "I am an admirer of Truffaut, Stanley Kubrick, Fellini. It'll be in that tradition. Hollywood needs that kind of movie." Filming was to start in Mexico on 15 September with Haskell Wexler doing cinematography.

However, due to the artistically challenging nature of the film, no studios were interested until Hopper's actual first film as a director, Easy Rider, became a massive hit in 1969.

Based on the success of Easy Rider, Universal launched a project to give five young film makers $1 million each, and give them free rein to create a movie with little to no intervention from the studio (as had been done on Easy Rider). The other four were The Hired Hand, Taking Off, Silent Running, and American Graffiti, directed by Peter Fonda, Miloš Forman, Douglas Trumbull, and George Lucas, respectively.

In October 1969 Universal announced Hopper would make the film for his Alta Light Production Company. (Hopper wanted to follow The Last Movie with another film called Second Chance about him and Fonda trying to raise money to make Easy Rider. This was never made.) The initial budget was $800,000.

Hopper wanted John Wayne and Henry Hathaway to appear in the movie as a homage to Sons of Katie Elder.

Filming
Hopper spent much of 1970 in Peru, bringing many of his actor and musician friends to Peru—including singer Kris Kristofferson and director Samuel Fuller—and shooting the film under the working title Chinchero.

Stewart Stern later said the film was ruined by improvisation saying "That script wasn't taken out of my hands so much as put aside. It's still perfectly serviceable." Stern did not go on location but at Hopper's request, he went to look at a rough cut in Taos: "Mainly, what I felt was very disappointed, not only that he didn't use the scenes as they were written in the screenplay and that he chose to improvise with people who were not up to that kind of improvisation, but also that he hadn't shot scenes that were essential. Including the ending of the picture." He then asked Hopper to shoot the scenes as written but that Hopper would not do it. "He acknowledges the value of the screenplay, but feels that that wasn't the picture that he had in mind then, and that he certainly isn't ashamed of having done what he did. I absolutely respect him for that." Despite these disagreements, Stern said he would be willing to collaborate with Hopper again.

Post-production
With hours and hours of footage, Hopper holed up in his home editing studio in Taos, New Mexico, but failed to deliver a cut by the end of 1970. He was in a period of severe alcohol and drug abuse (as shown in an extremely rare and barely released documentary titled The American Dreamer, which was directed by Lawrence Schiller and L.M. Kit Carson), but managed to put together a fairly straightforward cut in terms of conventional storytelling. He was mocked over it by his friend, cult director Alejandro Jodorowsky, who urged him to edit the film unconventionally and attempt to break new cinematic ground, which caused Hopper to destroy that edit and craft the more disjointed narrative that is known today; he finally completed that final edit in the spring of 1971.

Reception
The movie won the Critics Prize (CIDALC Award) at the Venice Film Festival but despite this, it failed financially and critically after a four-week run at New York City's East 59th Street Twins. (Contrary to some sources, including statements by Hopper himself, the film did play in other theaters across the country after its New York premiere, even playing at drive-ins under the name Chinchero.)

Hopper later said of the Universal films "None of these movies were distributed properly, none of them given a chance. I still believe that we were undermined because we didn't fit into the tax structure of Universal Pictures. Lew Wasserman (Universal's CEO) just killed them."

Owing to its resulting demise, Hopper did not direct again until 1980's Out of the Blue.

The book The Fifty Worst Films of All Time recounts the film's production in some detail, saying that the studio was so eager to cash in on the youth market following the success of Easy Rider that they gave Hopper carte blanche, and they were horrified with the results.

Legacy
The film's initial failure led to Hopper's virtual exile from Hollywood, one that lasted well over a decade. Nonetheless, by 1978, Hopper announced he was very proud of the film, and hosted many screenings. While he had disparaged the film in the past, Hopper said it was ahead of its time, and only now had audiences and critics started to understand his artistic vision.

In 2006, Hopper told Playboy that he had re-acquired the rights to the film and was planning a DVD release. The magazine even mentions at the time that Hopper held a screening of the film at the Playboy Mansion for Hugh Hefner and several Playmates. Hopper did not realize his plans to release the film on DVD before his death in May 2010.

On August 16, 2018, Arbelos Films, Vidiots & American Cinematheque hosted the Los Angeles 4K restoration premiere at Sid Grauman's Egyptian Theater in Hollywood, California. A Blu-ray of the film was announced for release on November 13, 2018.

See also
 List of American films of 1971
 Cargo cult

References

External links
 
 
 
 Review by Vincent Canby of The New York Times
 Critique of the film at Reverse Shot
 Account of the shoot from Life magazine

1971 films
Films directed by Dennis Hopper
American drama films
1971 drama films
Films set in Peru
Films shot in Peru
Universal Pictures films
Films with screenplays by Dennis Hopper
Films with screenplays by Stewart Stern
Cargo cults
1970s English-language films
1970s American films